The Klamath Theater Complex Fire, also known as the Bear Wallow Complex Fire, was the largest wildfire of the 2008 California wildfire season. The complex fire originated as 11 separate wildfires, before merging into a single massive complex fire that burned  in Northern California, and lasted for over 3 months. The progenitor fires of the fire complex were all caused by lightning. As of 2018, the Klamath Theater Complex Fire was the 10th largest fire in modern California history. The complex fire killed a total of two firefighters.

The fire
On June 20, 2008, the Blue 2 Fire was ignited by lightning near the eastern edge of Del Norte County. On the next day, the first fires within the Siskiyou Complex Fire were ignited by lightning further east, in the western fringes of Siskiyou County. On June 21, 2008, at 4:00 PM PDT, the Caribou Fire, the first fire in the Bear Wallow Complex Fire was sparked by lightning, to the east of the Blue 2 and Siskiyou Complex Fires, in Klamath National Forest, in Northern California. Soon afterward, the Anthony Milne Fire was ignited by lighting nearby, with firefighters managing the Caribou and Anthony Milne Fires together. Three other wildfires were subsequently ignited nearby, which quickly combined into the South Ukonom Complex Fire; the South Ukonom Complex Fire gradually expanded towards the other two wildfires. On July 23, the Caribou Fire significantly expanded in size, and also ran towards the Anthony Milne Fire. By August 8, the Caribou, Anthony Milne, and South Ukonom Complex Fires had merged, forming the Bear Wallow Complex Fire.

See also
 Rush Fire
 2008 California wildfires
 List of California wildfires
 Slater and Devil fires

References

External links
Klamath Theater Complex Fire reports - California Fire News

2008 California wildfires
June 2008 events in the United States
July 2008 events in the United States
August 2008 events in the United States
September 2008 events in the United States
Wildfires in Del Norte County, California
Wildfires in Siskiyou County, California